Visvaldas Matijošaitis (born 1957) is a Lithuanian politician, mayor of Kaunas, leader,  founder, and chairman of Vieningas Kaunas,  chairman for Mentor Lietuva Asociacija, president at Žalgirio Fondas Asociacija, and president for Lithuanian Cycling Federation. He founded Vičiūnų grupė in Vičiūnai.

He was also on the board of Kauno Energija AB, vice president for the Lithuanian Confederation of Industrialists, and member of the Kaunas City Council.

He was a potential candidate for 2019 Lithuanian presidential election.

His wife was Irena Matijošaitienė (1957–2013).

External links
Biography
Geriausias šalies meras Matijošaitis

1957 births
Living people
Mayors of places in Lithuania
Politicians from Kaunas
21st-century Lithuanian politicians
Businesspeople from Kaunas
Vilnius Gediminas Technical University alumni